2nd Street or Second Street may refer to:

Places

Hong Kong
 Second Street (Hong Kong), a road in Sai Ying Pun area

Singapore
 Second Street, a road in Siglap

United States
 2nd Street (Manhattan), New York City
 2nd Street, Los Angeles, California
 Second Street Cable Railway
 2nd Street Tunnel
 2nd Street (St. Louis), Missouri
 2nd Street station (Hudson–Bergen Light Rail), Hoboken, New Jersey
 2nd Street station (SEPTA), Center City, Philadelphia
 Northeast 2nd Street station, proposed in Boca Raton, Florida
 Second Street District, Austin, Texas

Other uses
 2nd Street (album), by Back Street Crawler, 1976

See also
 
 
 2nd Avenue (disambiguation)
 Second Street Bridge (disambiguation)
 Second Street Historic District (disambiguation)